Lake Guindon  is the name of a lake in Sainte-Anne-des-Lacs, Quebec. It is also the name of the community near the lake, and the former name of a post office there, which was subsequently renamed Sainte-Anne-des-Lacs.

References

Statistique Canada. 2002. Profils des communautés de 2001. Sainte-Anne-des-Lacs

Lakes of Laurentides